Robert Egan was a Republic of Ireland international footballer.

A left winger, Egan was capped once for the Republic of Ireland at senior level. He made his debut in a 4–0 win over Belgium on 20 April 1929 in Dalymount Park, Dublin.

At club level, Egan played for Dundalk and Newry Town. Born in County Tipperary, he was spotted in 1928 playing at junior level by Dundalk manager Joe McCleery who immediately signed him. His Dundalk debut was in a League of Ireland game against Brideville on 25 November 1928 and he became an ever-present for the remainder of the 1928/29 season. His nine-goal total was second only to Eddie Carroll's 37.

Egan and Carroll left Dundalk at the end of the season and signed for Newry Town.

Honours

1 Runner Up: Leinster Cup 1928–29.

References

External links
 Profile from soccerscene.ie

Republic of Ireland association footballers
Republic of Ireland international footballers
Dundalk F.C. players
Association football forwards
Association footballers from County Tipperary
League of Ireland players
Newry City F.C. players